Aulonemia herzogiana is a species of bamboo in the genus Aulonemia. It endemic to Madagascar.
It is part of the grass family and endemic to Latin America.

References

herzogiana